The Withlacoochee State Forest is  in the western central part in the U.S. state of Florida, near Lecanto, Inverness, Floral City, Brooksville, Ridge Manor, and Dade City. The forest was named for the Withlacoochee River, which passes through some of the major tracts within.

History
Withlacoochee State Forest was acquired by the federal government from private landowners between 1936 and 1939 under the provisions of the U.S. Land Resettlement Administration. The land acquired by the government would be named the Withlacoochee Development Service. The U.S. Forest Service managed the property until a lease-purchase agreement transferred the property to the Florida Board of Forestry in 1958.

Ghost towns within the community include Mannfield, Orleans, Oak Grove, Stage Pond, Croom, Rital, Richloam, Clay Sink, and others. Historic sites within the forest include the Etna Turpentine Camp Archeological Site and Richloam General Store and Post Office.

Recreation
The World Wildlife Fund listed the Withlacoochee State Forest as one of the "10 Coolest Places You've Never Been in North America" by the World Wildlife Fund. Activities include miles of trails for hiking, bicycling, horseback riding and canoeing. It includes several separate land tracts with many natural communities and habitats for wildlife. These tracts consist of the Two Mile Prairie Tract, the Homosassa Tract, the Citrus Tract, the Juniper Creek Tract, the Croom Tract, and the Richloam Tract. There are recreation activities for the use of visitors. Many hiking trails run through the forest including, but not limited to the Florida Trail, the Withlacoochee State Trail, the Good Neighbor Trail, and the General James A. Van Fleet State Trail. The many tree species in dense forests include slash pine, longleaf pine, pond cypress, bald cypress, oak, maple, and others, providing dense canopy trails for visitors.

See also
 Homosassa Springs Wildlife State Park
 Lake Townsen Regional Park
 Nobleton Wayside Park
 Cypress Lake Preserve

References

External links

 Withlacoochee State Forest: Florida Division of Forestry - FDACS

Florida state forests
Protected areas of Citrus County, Florida
Protected areas of Pasco County, Florida
Protected areas of Hernando County, Florida
Protected areas of Sumter County, Florida